Kevin Swiryn (born December 16, 1984) is an American rugby union player, who played professionally for Agen in the French Top 14. Swiryn played at both centre and wing.

Early life
Swiryn was born in San Jose, California. He started playing rugby when he was 19 years old after the American football program at Saint Mary's College of California was cut. He went on to be named to the All-American Team, where he captained the squad in 2008.

Professional career
Swiryn's national team debut was on May 31, 2009 against Ireland. He was selected to tour with the United States national rugby union team for the Autumn 2010 tour of Europe. He also made the U.S. squad for the 2011 Rugby World Cup. Swiryn temporarily retired at the end of 2011-12 Top 14 season due to persistent injuries, but returned a couple of years later. Swiryn also played for the United States national rugby sevens team. He came back to international duties in 2015 with the U.S. national rugby sevens team during their Olympic run, ahead of the 2016 Rio Games.

References
 Player Profile USA Rugby
 https://web.archive.org/web/20110727182941/http://web.usarugby.org/cgi-bin/viadesto/natteams/mnt/15ProfileDetail.pl?playerId=423

1984 births
Living people
American rugby union players
United States international rugby union players
United States international rugby sevens players